Postribë is a former municipality in the Shkodër County, northwestern Albania. At the 2015 local government reform it became a subdivision of the municipality Shkodër. The population at the 2011 census was 7,069. It includes the village of Urë e Shtrenjtë.

Villages:
Bajrak of Boks
Boksi
Dragoçi
Kullaj
Mesi
Myselimi
Rrashi
Vorfa

Bajrak of Drishti
Drishti
Vilzë
Urë e Shtrenjtë
Domni

Bajrak of Suma
Shakota
Suma

References

Former municipalities in Shkodër County
Administrative units of Shkodër